Tirel is a French surname which may have either been a nickname for a stubborn person (Old French: tirel, for a draught animal, from French tirer "to pull") or alternatively be a surname of baptismal origin from the personal name Thorvald (composite of Old Norse Þórr "Thor" and valdr "wielder", "ruler"). It is the source of the frequent English surnames Tyrrell, Tyrell, Terrell and Tirrell.
Notable people with this name include:
Christiane Tirel (born 1939), French botanist
Élodie Tirel (born 1972), French author of children's literature
Guillaume Tirel (ca. 1310 – 1395), French chef
John Tirel (died 1395), Irish judge
Walter Tirel (1065 – after 1100), Anglo-Norman nobleman

References

French-language surnames